Pennata is a wreck of the crater of Lake Miseno; it is part of the comune of Bacoli. It has been considered a small island since November 4, 1966 (the same day as the flood in Florence), when, following a violent sea storm, the strip of sand that connected it to the mainland disappeared. It is made up of yellow tuff and the very rich vegetation and the remains of brick structures show that it was a densely populated area.

References

External links 
 Isola Pennata, on italiamappata.it

Islands of Campania
Uninhabited islands of Italy